Dot dot dot may refer to:

 DOT DOT DOT (artist), Norwegian artist
 Dot Dot Dot (magazine)
 Ellipsis (…), a punctuation symbol
 Morse code for the letter "s"

See also
 Three dots (disambiguation)